The 2nd Wildflower Film Awards is an awards ceremony recognizing the achievements of Korean independent and low-budget films. It was held at the Literature House in Seoul on April 9, 2015. The selection committee was composed of 25 film professionals and regular audience members who met often to view and discuss new releases; their nomination list was further narrowed in the final voting stage by invited critics and programmers. 21 films were nominated across 10 categories from a pool of 60 narrative films and 30 documentaries, each with a budget under  and released theatrically between January 1 and December 31, 2014.

The nine categories from the inaugural ceremony were expanded to ten this year. An overall Grand Prize (Daesang) and Best Screenplay were added, Best Director was divided into narrative films and documentaries, and Best New Actor or Actress was divided into two according to gender. Founder and event director Darcy Paquet said, "Starting from the 2nd award ceremony onwards, we plan to keep this format."

There were ten awards in total: the Grand Prize, Best Director - Narrative Films, Best Director - Documentaries, Best Actor, Best Actress, Best New Director, Best New Actor, Best New Actress, Best Screenplay, and Best Cinematography. The Grand Prize was chosen among the 14 nominees for Best Director - Narrative Films and Best Director - Documentaries. Prizewinners each received a specially designed ceramic trophy from Konkuk University professor Harin Lee, a well-known figure in Korea's ceramic arts community.

In addition to the ceremony, six of the nominated films were screened in the three days leading up to the awards (April 6–8) at the Seoul Theater, along with Q&A sessions with the nominated directors and actors. The first volume of bilingual book Wildflower Film Awards Annual was also published, featuring essays and interviews on 11 independent Korean films, each accompanied by specially commissioned illustrations by local artists.

Nominations and winners
(Winners denoted in bold)

References

External links 

Wildflower Film Awards at Koreanfilm.org

Wildflower Film Awards
Wildflower Film Awards
Wildflower Film Awards